Halloween is a soundtrack album composed and performed by John Carpenter, featuring the score to the 1978 film Halloween. It was released in Japan in 1979 through Columbia Records and in the US in 1983 through Varèse Sarabande. An expanded 20th Anniversary Edition was released in 1998 through Varèse Sarabande.  In 2018, an LP was released by Mondo Records featuring the mono tracks taken from the original 35mm stem of the film and for the first time features the music as originally heard in theaters and on the earliest VHS releases of the film. The soundtrack would later play a major role in influencing the synthwave music genre.

Track listing

Personnel
 John Carpenter – composition, performance
 Dan Wyman – synthesizer programming
 Peter Bergren – recording engineer

References

1978 soundtrack albums
John Carpenter soundtracks
Horror film soundtracks
Film scores
Columbia Records soundtracks
Varèse Sarabande soundtracks
Halloween albums
Halloween (franchise) soundtracks